Alburg Dunes State Park is a state park in Alburgh, Vermont. The park lies on the shore of Lake Champlain and features one of the lake's largest beaches. It is named for the sand dunes near the center and western end of the south-facing natural sand beach.

This is a day use park with hours from 10 a.m. to sunset. There are sanitary facilities, a picnic area with grills, and parking. There is no public drinking water. A bicycle and pedestrian path goes between the dunes and wetlands.

The park includes the Charles E. Smith Natural Area, a sand dune community being managed by the State to protect and restore the rare plants that grow here.

References

External links
Official website

State parks of Vermont
Protected areas of Grand Isle County, Vermont
Alburgh, Vermont
1996 establishments in Vermont
Protected areas established in 1996